Carol Lee Flinders  is a writer, independent scholar, educator, speaker, and former syndicated columnist. She is best known as one of the three authors of Laurel's Kitchen along with Laurel Robertson and Bronwen Godfrey. She is also the co- author of The Making of a Teacher with Tim Flinders.

Early life and education
Flinders was born  to Gilbert H. and Jeanne Lee Ramage, and grew up on a farm in Oregon's Willamette Valley. In 1958 her family moved to Spokane. She graduated from North Central High School (Spokane, Washington) in 1961,<ref
      name=webster98></ref> later receiving a bachelors degree from Stanford University, and  a PhD in comparative literature from the University of California at Berkeley.

Career
Flinders became nationally known in 1976 through her coauthorship of Laurel's Kitchen, a widely acclaimed guide to vegetarian cookery that has been described as a "renowned countercultural cookbook,"
and as "the Fannie Farmer of vegetarian cooking." Later, cultural historians contended that "Laurel's Kitchen was as much a lifestyle guide as it was a cookbook."

Beginning in the late 1980s, Flinders published a series of books on spirituality. The first, entitled The Making of a Teacher (1989), was coauthored with her husband Timothy Flinders. It provided an oral history of the life and work of spiritual teacher Eknath Easwaran, who had helped inspire the creation of Laurel's Kitchen, and who in 1968 at U.C. Berkeley had taught what was believed to be the first accredited course on meditation at a Western university.<ref
    name=mot89> ISBN  0915132540</ref> 

She was a Lecturer in Spirituality at Holy Names College in Oakland, California.

Works

Vegetarian cooking
 Laurel Robertson, Carol Lee Flinders, and Bronwen Godfrey (1976). Laurel's Kitchen: a handbook for vegetarian cookery & nutrition. Berkeley, CA: Nilgiri Press. 
 Laurel Robertson, Carol Lee Flinders, and Bronwen Godfrey (1978).  Laurel's Kitchen: a handbook for vegetarian cookery & nutrition. New York: Bantam Books. 
 Laurel Robertson, Carol Lee Flinders, and Bronwen Godfrey (1979). Laurel's Kitchen: a handbook for vegetarian cookery & nutrition. London: Routledge & Kegan Paul Ltd. 
 Laurel Robertson, Carol Lee Flinders, and Brian Ruppenthal (1986). The New Laurel's Kitchen: a handbook for vegetarian cookery & nutrition. Berkeley, CA: Ten Speed Press. 

Additional Laurel's Kitchen books
Several related books have been published by the same groups of authors. These books were based on a similar underlying philosophy, and also included the phrase "Laurel's Kitchen" in the title:
 Laurel Robertson, Carol Lee Flinders, Bronwen Godfrey (1984). The Laurel's Kitchen bread book: a guide to whole-grain breadmaking. Random House. 
 Laurel Robertson, Carol Lee Flinders, Brian Ruppenthal (1993, revised edition). Laurel's Kitchen recipes. Berkeley, CA: Ten Speed Press. 
 Laurel Robertson, Carol Lee Flinders, Brian Ruppenthal (1997). Laurel's Kitchen caring: recipes for everyday home caregiving. Berkeley, CA: Ten Speed Press.

Column
Flinders published a syndicated newspaper column for 12 years (1977—1989), focused on vegetarian cookery. Entitled Notes from Laurel's Kitchen, it appeared in 20 newspapers in 1987. The column was published in a number of newspapers including The Spokesman-Review (Spokane, WA), and the
The Register-Guard (Eugene, OR).

Spirituality &/or feminism

 

Originally published as: 
 
  (191 pages). 
  (191 pages).

Chapters
Tim Flinders, Doug Oman, and Carol Flinders (2007). The eight-point program of passage meditation: Health effects of a comprehensive program. In Thomas G. Plante, & Carl E. Thoresen (Eds.), Spirit, science and health: How the spiritual mind fuels physical wellness (pp. 72-93). Westport, CT: Praeger. ISBN 978-0-275-99506-5
Tim Flinders, Doug Oman, and Carol Flinders (2009). Meditation as Empowerment for Healing. In J. Harold Ellens (Ed.), The Healing Power of Spirituality (Vol. I, pp. 213-240). Santa Barbara, CA: Praeger. ISBN 978-0-313-36645-1
Tim Flinders, Doug Oman, Carol Flinders, and Diane Dreher (2010). Translating Spiritual Ideals into Daily Life: The Eight Point Program of Passage Meditation. In Thomas G. Plante (Ed.), Contemplative Practices in Action: Spirituality, Meditation, and Health (foreword by Huston Smith) (pp. 35-59). Santa Barbara, CA: Praeger. ISBN 978-0-313-38256-7
Carol Flinders (2012). Mother-lines of body, mind, and spirit. In Kathe Schaaf, Kay Lindahl, Kathleen S. Hurty, Guo Cheen (Eds.), Women, spirituality, and transformative leadership: Where grace meets power (pp. 145-150). Woodstock, VT: SkyLight Paths. ISBN 9781594733130

Interviews & profiles

References

External links
Biography
Mystics in the Making

Living people
Year of birth missing (living people)
American cookbook writers

American food writers
American vegetarianism activists
Independent scholars
Mysticism scholars
Stanford University alumni
Vegetarian cookbook writers
University of California, Berkeley alumni